Otto Dix is a Russian dark wave music trio. Named after the expressionist painter of the same name, they are notable for their  singer, the contra tenor, Michael Draw.

The group's style
Otto Dix is a darkwave group with EBM and Industrial tunes. Draw calls their style "electronic avant-garde." The songs' themes centre around post-apocalyptic scenes, psychology, morals, and BDSM. The group uses strident, hysterical melodies in their music, sounding in minor tonalities. Some melodies are similar to Dark Ambient. Every song has a tiny solo performance and original image which is made by music, lyrics, Draw's movements, and unusual vocal abilities.

History
The musical band Otto Dix was formed in the summer of 2004 in Khabarovsk. The idea of the band and its name were introduced by Draw, who had participated in other bands before. At first, there was a third member who played the guitar. He introduced Draw to Slip, but some time later he left the band. Since then Otto Dix have been playing electronic music. Despite their European style, all songs are written in the Russian language. Draw believes that only the native language can fully express innermost thoughts.

Draw works as the centerpiece of the band and writes lyrics for their songs, and Slip composes music. Besides the band, they both write books and draw pictures. Their first appearance was on 28 November 2004. The band played only two songs ("White Dust" and "Penitence"). In 2004-2005 the band worked with the youth theatre "Paradigm of Time." Several articles about Otto Dix were published in the local press.

On 3 July, Otto Dix played their first concert away from their home city in Amursk. A few months later they recorded their first album, Ego, and shot a music video in a desolate factory in Amursk. Draw was the stage manager. However, due to the deplorable conditions of the Far Eastern musical culture the band did not fit any company, so they decided to form their own one. In winter 2005-2006 the gothic club "Morion" and a gothic forum were created by Draw.

In spring 2006, the Otto Dix performed in Vladivostok and, together with the members of Morion, shot a second video for the song "White Dust." The video hit the first place in the Far Eastern underground charts. In summer 2006 the band moved to St. Petersburg and released the album City. Soon after that a TV program about Otto Dix was broadcast in Khabarovsk. On 27 August, the first performance took place in St. Petersburg's "Red Club." It was successful, and Otto Dix were invited to play with the Italian Darkwave band The Frozen Autumn. Soon afterwards the band went on a mini-tour in support of the new album. On 2 March Otto Dix appeared in the TV program Unbelievable, But True on TNT. It gave a powerful stimulus to the band's development. Since then the new subculture movement "stalker-goth" began.

In 2007, Otto Dix toured numerous Russian cities. They had a great number of concerts, and this made them different from other bands of the similar genre. The band published the literary anthology "City" and worked on the upcoming album. On 17 September their new clip "Metal Fatigue" was first shown on the A1 channel.

On 28 September the books "Fuel" by Draw and "I am Machine" by Slip were published, and within a small period of time the third album Nuclear Winter was recorded.

In 2007, the band became a trio. Peter Voronov (violin) first performed with Otto Dix on 15 December. Then the band had the tour "Cyber vs. Violin."

In 2008, the book "Program Error" by Draw was published. Otto Dix began a tour around CIS countries.

In 2009, Otto Dix recorded the album Shadow Zone and released the video "Dream of Spring," which was assembled and composed by Draw. They went on a big tour which lasted for five months. Draw and Slip printed two more books: "Flesh and Steel" by Draw and "The Man Infu" by Slip. On 30 May 2009 Otto Dix took part in Wave-Gotik-Treffen festival in Leipzig. The album Starost was released in Germany.

In 2010 the band went on their first anniversary tour, which included a performance at the "Castle Party" festival in Poland and a concert in Berlin. In the end of 2010 Otto Dix recorded the album Wonderful Days, shot a video for the song "Beast" and went on a traditional tour in support of the new album.

On 20 April 2012, the first single of the band, "Utopia," was released. On 7 September 2012, the sixth studio album, Mortem, followed.

On 11 April 2013, the violinist Peter Voronov left Otto Dix. He explained his leave with his desire to focus on other musical projects and stated that in future his "participation will be possible in some concerts and recordings as a sessional musician." On 12 November 2013, the video for the song "Anima" from the upcoming album was released.

In 2017 they released their ninth studio album, 'Leviathan'.

In 2020 they released the new album Autokrator, which has been recently removed from Youtube and Spotify as a result of the immediate termination of contract by the label Danse Macabre Records caused by several pro Russia posts of the band after the Russian invasion of Ukraine.

Discography

Albums
 Эго (Ego) (2005) (As Отто Дикс) [Self-Released]
 Город (City) (2006) [Gravitator Records]
 Атомная Зима (Nuclear Winter) (2007) [AMG Records]
 Эго (Переиздание) (Ego) (2007) (Re-issued) [Dizzaster Records]
 Атомная Зима + Remixes (Atomic Winter) (2008)
 Зона Теней (Shadow Zone) (2009) [Gravitator Records]
 Чудные дни (Wonderful Days) (2010) [Gravitator Records / Dizzaster Records]
 Mortem (2012) [Dizzaster Records]
 Анима (Anima) (2014) [Dizzaster Records]
 Анимус (Animus) (2015) [Dizzaster Records]

DVDs
 Усталость Металла (Metal Fatigue) (2008) [Dizzaster Records]

Videography
 2005 - Ego
 2006 - White Dust
 2008 - Metal Fatigue
 2009 - Dream of Spring
 2010 - Beast
 2013 - Anima
 2014 - Старые Часы (Old Clock)
 2015 - Уроды (Creeps) 
 2016 - Дай мне воды" (Give Me Water)
 2016 - Глина" (Clay)  - Post production

References

External links
 
Otto Dix lyrics translated in English

Russian electronic music groups
Dark wave musical groups